Fucaia is an extinct genus of primitive baleen whale belonging to the family Aetiocetidae that is known from Oligocene marine deposits found in Vancouver Island, Canada and Olympic Island, Washington State.

Taxonomy
Two species, F. buelli and F. goedertorum (Barnes et al. 1995). F. buelli is of early Oligocene (Rupelian) age, while F. goedertorum is younger. The latter was originally described as a species of Chonecetus before it was recognized as more closely related to buelli than to the Choncetus type species.

Biology
The tooth structure of Fucaia indicates that it was capable of both raptorial feeding and suction-feeding, like other aetiocetids.

Sister taxa
Aetiocetus
Ashorocetus
Chonecetus
Morawanocetus
Willungacetus

References

Oligocene cetaceans
Prehistoric mammals of North America
Aetiocetidae
Prehistoric cetacean genera
Fossil taxa described in 2015